Jack Banham Coggins was an illustrator, author and artist, who is best known in the United States for his oil paintings of predominantly marine subjects and for his books on space travel.

Coggins also wrote and/or illustrated a large number of books on wide range of subjects, as well as providing many illustrations for advertisements, magazine articles and magazine covers.

The following are lists of all the known books illustrated and/or written by Coggins, and all of the known magazine covers he illustrated. Original U.S. editions only of the books and magazines are listed; many of these were published in other countries and languages. Several of the books have been re-published in new editions, which are not listed. All the listings link to an image of the original publication, more information and images are available on the external Link at the bottom of this page.

Terminology
Included with listed books are LCCN - Library of Congress Control Number and ISBN - International Standard Book Number, where available.

Books Written and Illustrated by Jack Coggins

1951 Rockets, Jets, Guided Missiles and Space Ships, Co-author: Fletcher Pratt, Publisher: Random House 
1952 By Space Ship to the Moon, Co-author: Fletcher Pratt, Publisher: Random House, 
1957 Illustrated Book of Knights, Publisher: Grosset & Dunlap Inc. 
1958 Rockets, Satellites and Space Travel, Co-author: Fletcher Pratt, Publisher: Random House, 
1959 Young Viking, Publisher: Tab Books
1962 Arms and Equipment of the Civil War, Publisher: Doubleday & Co., 
1963 Flashes and Flags, Publisher: Dodd, Mead & Co., 
1963 Horsemen of the World, Publisher: Doubleday & Co., 
1965 Nets Overboard, Publisher: Dodd, Mead & Co., 
1966 Fighting Man, The, Publisher: Doubleday & Co., 
1966 Horseman’s Bible, The, Doubleday & Co., 
1966 Hydrospace, Publisher: Dodd, Mead & Co., 
1967 Boys in the Revolution, Publisher: Stackpole Books, 
1967 By Star and Compass, Publisher: Dodd, Mead & Co., 
1969 Ships and Seamen of the American Revolution, Publisher: Promontory Press,  
1971 Prepare to Dive, Publisher: Dodd, Mead & Co., 
1972 Campaign for Guadalcanal, The, Publisher: Doubleday & Co.,  
1980 Campaign for North Africa, The, Publisher: Doubleday & Co.,  
1983 Marine Painter’s Guide, Publisher: Van Nostrand Reinhold Co. Inc,

Books Illustrated by Jack Coggins

1941 Fighting Ships of the US Navy, Author: Fletcher Pratt, Publisher: Garden City Publishing 
1943 Subchaser Jim, Author: Josef Berger, Publisher: Little, Brown & Co. 	
1946 Lion of Barbary, The, Author: Eleanor Hoffmann, Publisher: Holiday House 
1946 Counterspy Jim, Author: Josef Berger, Publisher: Little, Brown & Co. 
1947 Ships of the US Merchant Marine, Author: S. Kip Farrington, Publisher: E.P. Dutton & Co. Inc 
1953 Mystery of the Lion Ring, The, Author; Eleanor Hoffmann, Publisher: Dodd, Mead & Co. 
1953 First Book of Sailing, The, Author: Marion Lineaweaver, Publisher: Franklin Watts Inc, 
1953 Merry Mouse - Trip to the Moon, Author: Alma Coggins, Publisher: Jolly Books
1953 Great Trains of the World, Author: Wyatt Blassingame, Publisher: Random House, 
1954 Untouched by Human Hands, Author: Robert Sheckley, Publisher: Ballantine Books, 
1955 Big Book of Stars, Author: Leon A. Hausman, Publisher: Grosset & Dunlap 
1955 Diving for Sunken Treasure, Author: Harry E. Rieseberg, Publisher: Saml. Gabriel Sons & Co. 
1955 Science Book of Space Travel, The, Author: Harold L. Goodwin, Publisher: Pocket Books Inc.  
1957 Ferdinand Magellan, Author: Seymour Gates Pond, Publisher: Random House,  
1957 Space Satellite, Author: Beeland & Wells, Publisher: Prentice-Hall Inc., 
1958 All About Rockets and Jets, Author: Fletcher Pratt, Publisher: Random House Inc. 
1959 Engines, Author: L. Sprague de Camp, Publisher: Golden Press 
1959 Submarines, Author: Edward Stephens, Publisher: Golden Press 
1959 William the Conqueror, Author: Thomas B. Costain, Publisher: Random House, 
1961 Early Automobiles, Author: Eugene Rachlis, Publisher: Golden Press, 
1961 Navigation in the Jet Age, Author: Robert Wells, Publisher: Dodd, Mead & Co., 
1962 Early Warning, Author: Robert Wells, Publisher: Prentice-Hall Inc., 
1962 Hot Rod Thunder, Author: Joe Brennan, Publisher: Doubleday & Co., 
1963 Let’s Go on a Space Trip, Author: Michael Chester, Publisher: G.P. Putnam's Sons,

Magazine Covers Illustrated by Jack Coggins

April 1943 Popular Science Magazine
November 1943 Yachting Magazine
June 1948 Yachting Magazine
March 1951 Yachting Magazine
March 1952 Saga Magazine
May 1952 Galaxy Science Fiction
July 1952 Galaxy Science Fiction
August 1952 Yachting Magazine	               
September 1952 Galaxy Science Fiction
October 1952 Startling Stories	   	        
November 1952 Galaxy Science Fiction
February 1953 Thrilling Wonder Stories               
April 1953 Thrilling Wonder Stories
Apr-May 1953 Amazing Stories 
May 1953 The Magazine of Fantasy & Science Fiction
August 1953 Thrilling Wonder Stories	     
August 1953 The Magazine of Fantasy & Science Fiction  
September 1953 The Magazine of Fantasy & Science Fiction 
November 1953 Sci-Fi Quarterly                          
Spring 1954 Fantastic Story
May 1954 The Magazine of Fantasy & Science Fiction 
Summer 1954 Thrilling Wonder Stories
Fall 1954 Fantastic Story                       
Fall 1954 Thrilling Wonder Stories
Winter 1954 Thrilling Wonder Stories
July 1956 Galaxy Science Fiction                 
September 1956 Galaxy Science Fiction                 
February 1957 Galaxy Science Fiction
April 1957 Galaxy Science Fiction	               
August 1957 Galaxy Science Fiction
January 1958 United States Naval Institute Proceedings 
July 1958 United States Naval Institute Proceedings
1970 U.S. Department of Commerce
Summer 1970 SF Greats No. 18   
February 1979 United States Naval Institute Proceedings 
1967 Sci-Fi Yearbook Number 1	       
Autumn 2002 Naval War College Review

External links
Jack Coggins reference site and tribute - created by his family - includes images of many of his works.

Bibliographies by writer
Military art
Bibliographies of American writers
Science fiction bibliographies